Just Checking may refer to 
 Cheerios#Just Checking, a Cheerios commercial 
 Just Checking Limited, a home activity monitoring services company
 Just Checking: Scenes From the Life of an Obsessive-Compulsive, a book by Emily Colas